Leon Karemaker (born 18 May 1985) is a retired South African rugby union footballer. His regular playing position is eighthman. He most recently represents the Griquas in the Currie Cup and Vodacom Cup. He previously played for Western Province and Aurillac. During the 2011 Super Rugby season he played 2 games for the Cheetahs.

He retired at the end of 2015 to take up a post at Kimberley-based school :af:Hoërskool Diamantveld.

References

External links

itsrugby.co.uk profile

Living people
1985 births
South African rugby union players
Rugby union flankers
Rugby union number eights
Rugby union players from Cape Town
Cheetahs (rugby union) players
Western Province (rugby union) players
Griquas (rugby union) players